Eleanor Lucy V. Kendrick (born 8 June 1990) is an English actress best known for playing Anne Frank in the BBC's 2009 miniseries The Diary of Anne Frank, Ivy Morris in the first series of the 2010 revived Upstairs Downstairs, and Meera Reed in the HBO series Game of Thrones. She also voices Taelia Fordragon in World of Warcraft: Battle for Azeroth.

Early life
Kendrick was born in London. She attended Dulwich College Preparatory School, in Cranbrook, Kent, followed by Benenden School, also in Kent, and spent time with the National Youth Theatre. In October 2009, she began her BA in English Literature at the University of Cambridge.

Career
Kendrick has played roles in Waking the Dead (2004), Doctors (2004), In 2 Minds (2004), Prime Suspect: The Final Act (2006), Lewis (2007), and the film An Education, scripted by Nick Hornby and which premièred at the 2009 Sundance Film Festival.

Kendrick played Anne Frank in the 2009 miniseries The Diary of Anne Frank. She said that her approach to playing Frank was to "peel back the layers of idolisation and to think of the characters just as normal people". Her performance was praised for "bringing fresh realism to an iconic role".

In 2009, she made her stage début as Juliet in a Shakespeare's Globe production of Romeo and Juliet. In December 2010, she played maid Ivy Morris in BBC One's revival of Upstairs Downstairs. She did not return for the second series, broadcast in 2012.

In 2011, Kendrick appeared in the BBC Radio 4 production of Life and Fate. She also played the character Allison in Being Human in the episode "Puppy Love" in 2012. She returned to the role in the ultimate episode of the series "The Last Broadcast" in 2013.

In 2012, Kendrick was cast in the role of Meera Reed in season 3 of Game of Thrones. In 2013 she returned to the stage in In the Republic of Happiness and The Low Road at the Royal Court Theatre; she is also playing the character Constance on Sky1's Chickens. Kendrick also played the part of Helen in Misfits.

2016 saw Kendrick perform her first lead film role in The Levelling.

Kendrick's first play, Hole, premiered at the Royal Court Theatre in 2018 under the direction of Helen Goalen and Abbi Greenland. The play combines Greek mythology and physics to explore female rage and oppression. She wrote the play in 2016 as part of a writing group with the Royal Court.

Work

Film

Television

Video games

Radio

Theatre

References

External links
 

1990 births
People educated at Benenden School
English child actresses
English film actresses
English stage actresses
English lesbian actresses
National Youth Theatre members
English television actresses
Living people
English LGBT actors
20th-century LGBT people
21st-century LGBT people
English Shakespearean actresses
Actresses from Kent
21st-century English actresses
Alumni of the University of Cambridge
Actresses from London
English radio actresses
English voice actresses
English video game actresses
21st-century English dramatists and playwrights
English women dramatists and playwrights